Ronny van Poucke (10 February 1957, in IJzendijke – 3 October 2016, in IJzendijke) was a Dutch footballer who played as striker. From his youth until his retirement he was active in Belgium.

Honours

Player 

 RSC Anderlecht

 Belgian Cup: 1975-76
 European Cup Winners' Cup: 1975–76 (winners), 1976-77 (runners-up), 1977–78 (winners)
 European Super Cup: 1976
 Amsterdam Tournament: 1976
Tournoi de Paris: 1977
 Jules Pappaert Cup: 1977
 Belgian Sports Merit Award: 1978

References 

q

1957 births
2016 deaths
Dutch footballers
Association football forwards
R.S.C. Anderlecht players
K.V. Kortrijk players
Lierse S.K. players
R.A.A. Louviéroise players
K. Waterschei S.V. Thor Genk players
K. Beerschot V.A.C. players